Carl Anthony Carter Sr. (born March 7, 1964 in Fort Worth, Texas) was a former cornerback in the NFL. He played for the St. Louis/Phoenix Cardinals, Cincinnati Bengals, Tampa Bay Buccaneers, and Green Bay Packers. Collegiately, he played for the Texas Tech Red Raiders. According to the Star-Telegram, former Texas Tech Red Raider Carl Carter who played seven seasons in the NFL, died on May 15th, 2019 at the age of 55. Carter came to Texas Tech in the fall of 1982 and played in 33 games as a Red Raider.

Notes 

1964 births
Living people
American football cornerbacks
Texas Tech Red Raiders football players
St. Louis Cardinals (football) players
Phoenix Cardinals players
Cincinnati Bengals players
Tampa Bay Buccaneers players
Green Bay Packers players